Algeria Standard Time or DPRA Standard Time is the time zone for Algeria. It is 1 hour ahead of GMT/UTC (UTC+01:00) and is co-linear with neighboring Tunisia.

IANA time zone database
The IANA time zone database contains one zone for Algeria in the file zone.tab.

References